is a railway station in Yamaguchi, Yamaguchi Prefecture, Japan.

Lines 
West Japan Railway Company
Yamaguchi Line

Layout 
Watarigawa Station has one side platform serving bi-directional traffic.

Adjacent stations 

Railway stations in Yamaguchi Prefecture
Railway stations in Japan opened in 1961